The Alice is a very small "sugarcube" mobile robot (2x2x2cm) developed at the Autonomous Systems Lab (ASL) at the École Polytechnique Fédérale de Lausanne in Lausanne, Switzerland between 1998 and 2004. It has been part of the Institute of Robotics and Intelligent Systems (IRIS) at  Swiss Federal Institute of Technology in Zürich (ETH Zurich) since 2006. 

It was designed with the following goals:
 Design an intelligent mobile robot as cheap and small as possible
 Study collective behavior with a large quantity of robots
 Acquire knowledge in highly integrated intelligent system
 Provide a hardware platform for further research

Technical specifications

Main Features 
 Dimensions: 22 mm x 21 mm x 20 mm
 Velocity: 40 mm/s
 Power consumption: 12 - 17 mW
 Communication: local IR 6 cm, IR & radio 10 m
 Power autonomy: up to 10 hours

Main Robot 
 2 SWATCH motors with wheels and tires
 Microcontroller PIC16LF877 with 8Kwords Flash program memory
 Plastic frame and flex print with all the electronic components
 4 active IR proximity sensors (reflection measurement)
 NiMH rechargeable battery
 Receiver for remote control
 24 pin connector for extension, voltage regulator and power switch

Extension modules
 Linear camera 102 pixels
 Bidirectional radio communication
 Tactile sensors
 Zigbee ready radio module running TinyOS

Projects and applications
 20 robots at Swiss Expo.02
 RobOnWeb
 Navigation and map building
 Soccer Kit : 2 teams of 3 Alices play soccer on an A4 page
 Collective behavior investigations:  video.mov 1 and 2
 Mixed society robots-insects as part of the European LEURRE project
 Investigation of levels of selection and relatedness on the evolution of cooperation in the ANTS project

References

 Caprari, G. Autonomous Micro-Robots: Applications and Limitations. PhD Thesis EPFL n° 2753 PDF Abstract
 Autonomous Systems Lab. (ASL) Index - Welcome. ETH Zurich - Home Page

External links
 
 The homepage of the Alice microrobot at the Autonomous Systems Lab at EPFL no longer works or was moved; however,
 - Autonomous Systems Lab Robots where Alice and other robots reside
 - Autonomous Systems Lab at EPFL before 2006
 - Autonomous Systems Lab at ETH now since 2006
 Collaborative Coverage with up to 30 Alices
  - Zigbee ready radio module running TinyOS

Prototype robots
Robots of Switzerland
Micro robots
Differential wheeled robots
1998 robots
Multi-robot systems